W.C. is an Irish independent film about two toilet attendants working in a jazz bar.  The film premiered at the 2007 Dublin Film Festival and was screened at several other international film festivals. It won the 'best foreign film' award at the 2009 Las Vegas Film Festival and 'best feature film' at the Waterford Film Festival. The film received a broader release in 2009.

References

External links
 
 Director Liam O Mochain: From “WC” to VOD at indieWire

2007 films
Irish independent films
English-language Irish films
2000s English-language films